The Paul Gauguin Museum is a Japanese-styled art museum dedicated to the life and works of Paul Gauguin in Tahiti, French Polynesia. The Museum is closed for renovations - but the sister museum in Hiva Oa is open. 

The museum is located at PK 51, 2 Papeari, Tahiti, directly across from the Botanical Gardens. French Polynesian and Marquesan cultural aspects are represented in its exhibits, which include original Paul Gauguin documents, photographs, reproductions, sculptures, engravings and gouaches. Also included and unseen in years are some of his sketches and block prints. 

The museum closed in 2013.

See also
 Paul Gauguin Cultural Center
 List of single-artist museums

References

Gauguin, Paul, Museum
Art museums and galleries in French Polynesia
Museums in Tahiti
Gauguin, Paul
Tahitian art
Paul Gauguin
Defunct museums in French Polynesia
Museums established in 1965
1965 establishments in French Polynesia